Riverdale is a town in McLean County, North Dakota, United States. The population was 223 at the 2020 census.

Riverdale was the largest of the construction camps that sprang up in 1946 to house workers building the Garrison Dam just to the west. After the dam was completed in 1953, residents of the other camps (including Dakota City and Big Bend) who decided to stay on relocated to Riverdale. It was operated by the federal government from its establishment until 1986, when it was turned over to the state of North Dakota with incorporation following shortly thereafter.

Geography

Riverdale is located at  (47.499853, -101.370074).

Demographics

2010 census
As of the census of 2010, there were 205 people, 103 households, and 67 families residing in the city. The racial makeup of the city was 94.6% White, 2.9% Native American, 2.0% Asian, and 0.5% from two or more races.

There were 103 households, of which 11.7% had children under the age of 18 living with them, 61.2% were married couples living together, 2.9% had a female householder with no husband present, 1.0% had a male householder with no wife present, and 35.0% were non-families. 30.1% of all households were made up of individuals, and 10.7% had someone living alone who was 65 years of age or older. The average household size was 1.99 and the average family size was 2.40.

The median age in the city was 56.2 years. 9.8% of residents were under the age of 18; 3% were between the ages of 18 and 24; 14.6% were from 25 to 44; 48.7% were from 45 to 64; and 23.9% were 65 years of age or older. The gender makeup of the city was 50.7% male and 49.3% female.

2000 census
As of the census of 2000, there were 273 people, 108 households, and 84 families residing in the city. The population density was 195.1 people per square mile (75.3/km). There were 157 housing units at an average density of 112.2 per square mile (43.3/km). The racial makeup of the city was 96.34% White, 2.20% Native American, 0.73% Asian, and 0.73% from two or more races.

There were 108 households, out of which 27.8% had children under the age of 18 living with them, 75.9% were married couples living together, 0.9% had a female householder with no husband present, and 21.3% were non-families. 19.4% of all households were made up of individuals, and 5.6% had someone living alone who was 65 years of age or older. The average household size was 2.53 and the average family size was 2.86.

In the city, the population was spread out, with 22.7% under the age of 18, 4.4% from 18 to 24, 21.6% from 25 to 44, 31.5% from 45 to 64, and 19.8% who were 65 years of age or older. The median age was 46 years. For every 100 females, there were 103.7 males. For every 100 females age 18 and over, there were 113.1 males.

The median income for a household in the city was $48,333, and the median income for a family was $52,250. Males had a median income of $50,972 versus $27,500 for females. The per capita income for the city was $18,970. None of the families and 3.8% of the population were living below the poverty line, including no under eighteens and 5.7% of those over 64.

Climate
This climatic region is typified by large seasonal temperature differences, with warm to hot (and often humid) summers and cold (sometimes severely cold) winters.  According to the Köppen Climate Classification system, Riverdale has a humid continental climate, abbreviated "Dfb" on climate maps.

Education
Riverdale High School was closed in the 1980s and consolidated with the high school in nearby Underwood, North Dakota.

Sports
The high school athletic teams were named the Knights and the school colors were red and white.  The school fielded a nine-man football team. The team played local nine-man teams including Stanton, Goodrich, White Shield and Bowdon.

References

Cities in McLean County, North Dakota
Cities in North Dakota
Populated places established in 1946
North Dakota populated places on the Missouri River
1946 establishments in North Dakota